The EMD GM6W diesel-electric locomotive was introduced by Electro-Motive Diesel as an export model switcher in 1960.

The prototype unit spent its entire life at the General Motors LaGrange, Illinois, plant. It wound up life at the Pielet Brothers Scrap yard next to EMD's plant and was eventually scrapped.

It inspired limited sales. Four went to the Chemin de Fer de l'Etat Libanais in Lebanon One known unit, built January 1961, was bought by the Buffelsfontein Gold Mine at Stilfontein in North West Province, South Africa.

Original Owners

References 

G06MW
C locomotives
Diesel-electric locomotives of Lebanon
Diesel-electric locomotives of South Africa
Railway locomotives introduced in 1960
Standard gauge locomotives of Lebanon
Cape gauge railway locomotives